Carmen is a surname.  Notable people with the name include:

Eric Carmen (born 1949), American singer, songwriter
Ira Carmen (born 1934), American professor
Jean Carmen (1913–1993), American actress
Jeanne Carmen (1930–2007), American model and actress
Jewel Carmen (1897–1984), American actress
Julie Carmen (born 1954), American actress
Loene Carmen (born 1973), American actress
Marie Carmen (born 1959), Canadian singer and actor
Phil Carmen (born 1953), Swiss musician and producer
Richard Carmen  (born 1968), American actor
Sybil Carmen (1896–1929), American actress and dancer

See also
Carman (surname)
Carmon, surname
Carmin (disambiguation), includes list of people with name Carmin